Stock Township is one of the fifteen townships of Noble County, Ohio, United States.  The 2000 census found 383 people in the township.

Geography
Located in the eastern part of the county, it borders the following townships:
Marion Township - north
Seneca Township, Monroe County - northeast corner
Franklin Township, Monroe County - east
Elk Township - southeast
Jefferson Township - southwest
Enoch Township - west
Center Township - northwest

No municipalities are located in Stock Township, although the unincorporated community of East Union lies in the township's northwest.

Name and history
Statewide, the only other Stock Township is located in Harrison County.

Government
The township is governed by a three-member board of trustees, who are elected in November of odd-numbered years to a four-year term beginning on the following January 1. Two are elected in the year after the presidential election and one is elected in the year before it. There is also an elected township fiscal officer, who serves a four-year term beginning on April 1 of the year after the election, which is held in November of the year before the presidential election. Vacancies in the fiscal officership or on the board of trustees are filled by the remaining trustees.

References

External links
Noble County Chamber of Commerce 

Townships in Noble County, Ohio
Townships in Ohio